Naamen Meziche is a French national of Algerian origin. According to Pakistani intelligence, he is a leader of Al-Qaeda and is associated with terrorist groups in Europe.

Pakistani sources say that Meziche had worked closely with Younis al-Mauritani, an Al-Qaeda leader.

Capture
Pakistan officials captured Naamen Meziche in a raid near the border with Iran sometime in the middle of June 2012.

Meziche was extradited to France in October 2013.

References

External links

Living people
French al-Qaeda members
French people of Algerian descent
French expatriates in Pakistan
Year of birth missing (living people)